The Pakistan cricket team toured England in the 1971 season to play a three-match Test series against England. England won the series 1-0 with 2 matches drawn.

Test series summary

First Test

Second Test

Third Test

External sources
 CricketArchive – tour itineraries

Annual reviews
 Playfair Cricket Annual 1972
 Wisden Cricketers' Almanack 1972

1971 in English cricket
1971
International cricket competitions from 1970–71 to 1975
1971 in Pakistani cricket